Harry Greene may refer to:

 Harry Ashland Greene (1852–1933), American businessman and philanthropist
 Harry Greene (television personality) (1923–2013), Welsh television personality
 Harry Plunket Greene (1865–1936), Irish baritone singer
 Harry S.N. Greene (1904–1969), American pathologist
 Harry W. Greene (born 1945), herpetologist
 Harold J. Greene (1959–2014), American military officer

See also
 Harry Green (disambiguation)